Jarecki v. G.D. Searle & Co., 367 U.S. 303 (1961), was a U.S. Supreme Court case.

Jarecki is an example of the maxim noscitur a sociis—a word is known by the company it keeps.  The Court noted that noscitur a sociis is not an inescapable rule.  It further noted that the maxim is often wisely applied where a word is capable of many meanings.  The reason that it is applied in the case of many meanings is that it avoids giving unintended breadth to Acts of Congress.

See also
 List of United States Supreme Court cases, volume 367

External links

United States Supreme Court cases
United States Supreme Court cases of the Warren Court
United States statutory interpretation case law
United States taxation and revenue case law
1961 in United States case law